Equinox is a Canadian drama film, directed by Arthur Lamothe and released in 1986. Lamothe's first narrative feature film in 18 years after having concentrated exclusively on documentary films since 1968's Dust from Underground (Poussière sur la ville), the film stars Jacques Godin as Guillaume, a man returning to his hometown for the first time since being wrongfully convicted of a crime he did not commit, in order to confront the former friend whose false testimony resulted in Guillaume being sent to prison.

The cast also includes Marthe Mercure, André Melançon, Ariane Frédérique, Marcel Sabourin, Luc Proulx and Gaston Lepage.

The film was shot in the rural Îles de Sorel near Sorel-Tracy, Quebec, in 1985, and premiered at the 1986 Montreal World Film Festival.

Critical response

In his 2003 book A Century of Canadian Cinema, Gerald Pratley called the film a triumph of cinematography over script. For the Montreal Gazette, Bruce Bailey dismissed the film as "something of a cross between a Beachcombers episode and something from Walt Disney's Adventureland", concluding that it "has more depth than something made for TV. But only barely."

José Arroyo of Cinema Canada reviewed the film more positively, writing that "the film works best as a psychological drama with Guillaume's journey of self-discovery as a focus...Lamothe's experience as a documentary filmmaker here serves him very well." He concluded that "Equinoxe could have used a tighter structure. But it is very well acted and beautifully shot. I find the image of a leonine Godin, paddling a canoe through marshes to come to a rendez-vous with his past, unforgettable. A film that has this much going for it deserves to be seen by more people."

Awards
The film received two Genie Award nominations at the 8th Genie Awards in 1987, for Best Cinematography (Guy Dufaux) and Best Original Song (Gilles Vigneault for "Les îles de l'enfance").

References

External links

1986 films
1986 drama films
Canadian drama films
Films directed by Arthur Lamothe
Films shot in Quebec
Films set in Quebec
1980s French-language films
French-language Canadian films
1980s Canadian films